The 2015 USL season was the fifth season of the United Soccer League (USL) and the first under its new name (previously the league was called USL Pro). This season represented a substantial expansion from 14 teams in 2014 to 24 teams in 2015, and the division of the league into two conferences. It is also the 29th season of third-division soccer in the United States.

Seven Major League Soccer clubs created reserve franchises in the USL for the 2015 season, following the lead of the LA Galaxy, who had done so in 2014: FC Montreal, New York Red Bulls II, Portland Timbers 2, Real Monarchs, Seattle Sounders FC 2, Toronto FC II, and Vancouver Whitecaps FC 2.

In 2015, the Austin Aztex, Colorado Springs Switchbacks, Saint Louis FC and Tulsa Roughnecks joined the league as expansion sides. The Charlotte Eagles and Dayton Dutch Lions, both original founding members of the USL, removed themselves to the Premier Development League. The Eagles transferred their USL rights to the new Charlotte Independence club. After joining MLS, Orlando City sold their USL franchise rights to Louisville City.

Teams, stadiums, and affiliations

There are eight USL teams owned and operated by MLS clubs and 11 USL-MLS affiliations among the 24 USL clubs.

Player transfers 

For full article, see List of USL transfers 2015.

Competition format
Due to expansion, the league was divided into two conferences, Eastern and Western. Each team plays the clubs within their conferences in a home and away series plus six additional games with geographic rivals regardless of conference for a 28-game schedule. The top six finishers in each conference qualify for the four-week playoffs.

League table
Eastern Conference

Western Conference

Results table

USL published schedule and results.

Playoffs

Teams will be seeded No. 1 through No. 6 in each conference, with the top two seeds receiving first-round byes and the No. 3 seed hosting the No. 6 seed and the No. 4 seed hosting the No. 5 seed.

The winner of the No. 3 vs. No. 6 game will then travel to face the No. 2 seed, and the winner of the No. 4 vs. No. 5 game will travel to face the No. 1 seed. The winners will meet in the Eastern and Western Conference Championship games with the remaining two teams advancing to square off in the 2015 USL Championship, hosted by the higher seeded club.

Eastern Conference

Western Conference

USL Championship

Championship Game MVP: Asani Samuels (ROC)

Attendance

Average home attendances

Ranked from highest to lowest average attendance.

† 1 game not reported

Statistical leaders

Top scorers 
(Minimum of 50% of Team Games Played)

Source:

Top assists 
(Minimum of 50% of Team Games Played)

Source:

|}

Top Goalkeepers 
(Minimum of 33% of Team Minutes Played)

Source:

League awards

Individual awards 
 Most Valuable Player: Matt Fondy (LOU) 
 Rookie of the Year: Kharlton Belmar (POR) 
 Defender of the Year: Bryan Burke (LOU) 
 Goalkeeper of the Year: Brandon Miller (ROC) 
 Coach of the Year: Bob Lilley (ROC)

All-League Teams 
First Team

F: Matt Fondy (LOU), Danni König (OKC), Long Tan (AZU)
M: Luke Vercollone (COL), Rob Vincent (PIT),  Tony Walls (ROC)
D: Bryan Burke (LOU), Shawn Ferguson (CHB),  Daniel Steres (LAG), Grant Van De Casteele (ROC)
G: Brandon Miller (ROC)

Second Team

F: Kharlton Belmar (POR), Dane Kelly (CHB), Jason Yeisley (RIC)
M: Gareth Evans (OKC), Kevin Kerr (PIT), Rodrigo Lopez (SAC)
D: Mickey Daly (SAC), Brenton Griffiths (OCB),  Mechack Jerome (CHA), Nemanja Vukovic (SAC)
G: Odisnel Cooper (CHB)

References

 
USL Championship seasons
2015 in American soccer leagues